The Aventinus-class aircraft repair ship was a class of repair ships that were operated by the United States Navy during World War II.

Design 

Aventinus-class was a ship class consisting of two modified LST-542-class tank landing ships, where they serve as aircraft repair ships in late 1945. They have the same hull measurements with changes taken place on their armaments and displacements, alongside a workshop to carry out their role. Only LST-1092 (Aventinus) and LST-1094 (Chloris) were chosen to be modified and redesignated ARVE, with "E" standing for aircraft "Engine".

Both ships survived the war and were mothballed for a short while, before Aventinus was reactivated amid the Korean War in the 1950s. Chile bought Aventinus and renamed her to Aguila (ARV-135).

Ships in the class

References

World War II auxiliary ships of the United States
Korean War auxiliary ships of the United States
Ships built in Ambridge, Pennsylvania
Auxiliary ships of the Chilean Navy